Michael Earl Rodríguez (born November 28, 1988) is an American mixed martial artist currently competing in the light heavyweight division. He has formerly competed for the Ultimate Fighting Championship.

Mixed martial arts career

Early career 
Rodríguez started his professional MMA career in 2013  and fought under Classic Entertainment & Sports (CES MMA) and Cage Titans promoters in the northeast region of United States. He achieved a record of 8–2 in Dana White's Contender Series.

Dana White's Contender Series 
Rodríguez appeared in Dana White's Contender Series 5 web-series program, facing Jamelle Jones on August 8, 2017. He won the fight via a flying-knee knockout and earned a UFC contract.

Ultimate Fighting Championship
Rodríguez made his UFC debut on April 7, 2018, at UFC 223, facing Devin Clark. He lost the fight by unanimous decision.

Rodríguez's second UFC fight was on December 15, 2018, at UFC on Fox: Lee vs. Iaquinta 2 against Adam Milstead. He won the fight via TKO in the first round.

Rodríguez faced John Allan on July 13, 2019, at UFC Fight Night: de Randamie vs. Ladd. He originally lost the fight via unanimous decision, however, Allen tested positive for a banned hormone and metabolic modulator tamoxifen for which he received a one-year USADA suspension and was fined $4,800 by the California State Athletic Commission which overruled the original decision to a no contest.

Rodríguez faced Da Un Jung on December 21, 2019, at UFC Fight Night 165. He lost the fight via knockout in the first round.

Rodríguez faced Marcin Prachnio on August 22, 2020, at UFC on ESPN 15. He won the fight via knockout in the first round.

Rodríguez faced Ed Herman on September 12, 2020, at UFC Fight Night 177. He lost the fight via a kimura in round three. Due to a controversial decision by the referee to pause the fight in the second round after mistaking a clean shot from Rodríguez for a low blow, the organization awarded Rodríguez his win bonus despite the loss. Subsequently, Rodríguez's team also appealed the loss with the NSAC. In turn, the request for an appeal was denied.

Rodríguez faced Danilo Marques on February 6, 2021, at UFC Fight Night 184. He lost the fight via rear-naked choke in round two.

Rodríguez faced Tafon Nchukwi on September 18, 2021, at UFC Fight Night 192. He lost the fight via unanimous decision.

After the loss, Rodríguez was released by the UFC.

Mixed martial arts record

|-
|Win
|align=center|12–7 (1)
|Jeremy May
|TKO (elbows)
|CES 69
|
|align=center|1
|align=center|3:25
|Lincoln, Rhode Island, United States
|
|-
|Loss
|align=center|11–7 (1)
|Tafon Nchukwi
|Decision (unanimous)
|UFC Fight Night: Smith vs. Spann
|
|align=center|3
|align=center|5:00
|Las Vegas, Nevada, United States
|
|-
|Loss
|align=center|11–6 (1)
|Danilo Marques
|Technical Submission (rear-naked choke)
|UFC Fight Night: Overeem vs. Volkov
|
|align=center|2
|align=center|4:52
|Las Vegas, Nevada, United States
|
|-
|Loss
|align=center|11–5 (1)
|Ed Herman
|Submission (kimura)
|UFC Fight Night: Waterson vs. Hill
|
|align=center|3
|align=center|4:01
|Las Vegas, Nevada, United States
|
|-
|Win
|align=center|11–4 (1)
|Marcin Prachnio
|KO (elbow and punches)
|UFC on ESPN: Munhoz vs. Edgar
|
|align=center|1
|align=center|2:17
|Las Vegas, Nevada, United States
|
|-
|Loss
|align=center|10–4 (1)
|Da Un Jung
|KO (punches)
|UFC Fight Night: Edgar vs. The Korean Zombie
|
|align=center|1
|align=center|1:04
|Busan, South Korea
|
|-
|NC
|align=center|10–3 (1)
|John Allan
|NC (overturned)
|UFC Fight Night: de Randamie vs. Ladd
|
|align=center|3
|align=center|5:00
|Sacramento, California, United States
|
|-
|Win
|align=center|10–3
|Adam Milstead
|TKO (knee to the body and punches)
|UFC on Fox: Lee vs. Iaquinta 2
|
|align=center|1
|align=center|2:59
|Milwaukee, Wisconsin, United States
|
|-
|Loss
|align=center|9–3
|Devin Clark
|Decision (unanimous)
|UFC 223
|
|align=center|3
|align=center|5:00
|Brooklyn, New York, United States
|
|-
|Win
|align=center|9–2
|Jamelle Jones
|KO (flying knee)
|Dana White's Contender Series 5
|
|align=center|1
|align=center|2:15
|Las Vegas, Nevada, United States
|
|-
|Win
|align=center|8–2
|Alec Hooben
|TKO (punches and elbows)
|CES MMA 44
|
|align=center|1
|align=center|4:46
|Lincoln, Rhode Island, United States
|
|-
|Win
|align=center|7–2
|James Dysard
|TKO (punches)
|CES MMA 43
|
|align=center|1
|align=center|0:39
|Beverly, Massachusetts, United States
|
|-
|Win
|align=center|6–2
|Hector Sanchez
|KO (punches)
|CES MMA 41
|
|align=center|1
|align=center|0:07
|Lincoln, Rhode Island, United States
|
|-
|Loss
|align=center|5–2
|Kevin Haley
|Submission (toe hold)
|CES MMA 39
|
|align=center|1
|align=center|1:08
|Plymouth, Massachusetts, United States
|
|-
|Win
|align=center|5–1
|John Poppie
|Submission (triangle choke)
|CES MMA 38
|
|align=center|2
|align=center|1:32
|Lincoln, Rhode Island, United States
|
|-
|Win
|align=center|4–1
|Stephond Ewins
|KO (flying knee)
|CES MMA 37
|
|align=center|1
|align=center|3:38
|Lincoln, Rhode Island, United States
|
|-
|Win
|align=center|3–1
|Buck Pineau
|Submission (rear-naked choke)
|CES MMA 35
|
|align=center|2
|align=center|4:03
|Beverly, Massachusetts, United States
|
|-
|Loss
|align=center|2–1
|Pat McCrohan
|Decision (unanimous)
|CES MMA 32
|
|align=center|3
|align=center|5:00
|Lincoln, Rhode Island, United States
|
|-
|Win
|align=center|2–0
|Stephen Stengel
|TKO (punches)
|Cage Titans 21
|
|align=center|1
|align=center|1:22
|Plymouth, Massachusetts, United States
|
|-
|Win
|align=center|1–0
|Ralph Johnson
|TKO (retirement)
|Cage Titans 18
|
|align=center|1
|align=center|3:50
|Plymouth, Massachusetts, United States
|
|-

See also 
 List of male mixed martial artists

References

External links 
  
 

1988 births
Living people
American practitioners of Brazilian jiu-jitsu
Light heavyweight mixed martial artists
Mixed martial artists utilizing Brazilian jiu-jitsu
American male mixed martial artists
Ultimate Fighting Championship male fighters
Sportspeople from Boston
Mixed martial artists from Massachusetts